Vasantsena may refer to:

 Vasantsena (1929 film), an Indian film directed by Dadasaheb Phalke
 Vasantsena (1942 film), a Bollywood film directed by Gajanan Jagirdar

See also
 Vasantasena, a courtesan heroine of ancient Indian literature
 Vasantasena (1941 film), an Indian Kannada film directed by Ramayyar Shirur